Masiero is an Italian surname. Notable people with the surname include:
 Corinne Masiero (born 1964), French actress
 Enea Masiero (1933–2009), Italian footballer and manager
 Guido Masiero (1895–1942), Italian World War I flying ace
 Joseph Masiero (born 1982), American astronomer
 Lauretta Masiero (1927–2010), Italian actress and singer
 Matías Masiero (born 1988), Uruguayan footballer
 Mattia Masiero (born 1986), Italian footballer

Italian-language surnames